Montalto Ligure was a comune (municipality) in the Province of Imperia in the Italian region Liguria, located about  southwest of Genoa and about  west of Imperia. At the beginning of 2018 Montalto Ligure was unified with Carpasio in the new comune of Montalto Carpasio.

Montalto Ligure bordered the following municipalities: Badalucco, Carpasio, Dolcedo, Molini di Triora, and Prelà.

Demographic evolution

References

Frazioni of the Province of Imperia
Former municipalities of the Province of Imperia